Maximilian Maria Joseph Karl Gabriel Lamoral Reichsfreiherr von und zu Weichs an der Glon (12 November 1881 – 27 September 1954) was a field marshal in the Wehrmacht of Nazi Germany during World War II. 

Born into an aristocratic family, Weichs joined the Bavarian cavalry in 1900 and fought in the First World War. At the outbreak of the Second World War he commanded the XIII Corps in the invasion of Poland. He later commanded the 2nd Army during the invasions of France, Yugoslavia and the Soviet Union. 

In August 1942 during Case Blue, the German offensive in southern Russia, he was appointed commander of Army Group B. In 1944, Weichs commanded Army Group F in the Balkans overseeing the German retreat from Greece and most of Yugoslavia. During the Nuremberg Trials, Weichs was implicated in war crimes committed in the Balkans and was scheduled to take part in the US Army's Hostages Trial. He was removed from the proceeding for "medical reasons" without having been judged or sentenced.

Early life and career

World War I
Born in 1881 into an aristocratic family, Maximilian von Weichs entered the Bavarian Cavalry in 1900 and participated in World War I as a staff officer. After the war he remained in the newly created Reichswehr where he worked at a number of General Staff positions.

Inter-war years

Transferred from the 3rd Cavalry Division to command Germany's 1st Panzer Division upon its formation in October 1935, he led the unit in maneuvers that impressed Army Commander in Chief Werner von Fritsch. Weichs' aristocratic and cavalry credentials demonstrated the continuing influence of these military elites in Germany's modernizing force. In October 1937 he became the commander of the XIII Army Corps, that later served in the 1938 German annexation of the Sudetenland.

World War II

To prepare for the German invasion of Poland beginning World War II in 1939, Weichs was appointed head of his own Army Corps "Weichs". 
After the Polish surrender, he was made Commander-in-Chief of the 2nd Army, a part of Rundstedt's Army Group A in the West. After the Battle of France, he was awarded the Knight's Cross of the Iron Cross and promoted to colonel-general. Leading his army, Weichs later took part in the Balkans Campaign, and in preparation for Operation Barbarossa, the German invasion of the Soviet Union, he was assigned to lead the 2nd Army as a part of Fedor von Bock’s Army Group Centre. He led the 2nd Army in 1941 through the Battle of Kiev, the Battle of Smolensk, and then on to Vyazma and Bryansk.

In 1942, for Fall Blau, Weichs was assigned to lead the newly created Army Group B. Army Group B was composed of Salmuth's 2nd Army, Hoth’s 4th Panzer Army, and Paulus's 6th Army. In addition to the German armies, Army Group B included the 2nd Hungarian Army, 8th Italian Army, the Third and the Fourth Romanian Armies. The 6th Army was assigned to take the city of Stalingrad and cover approximately 800 km of front.

The Soviet Operation Uranus broke through the Romanian armies on his flanks, cutting off the 6th Army inside Stalingrad. Suggesting retreat, Weichs fell out of Hitler’s favor. Consequently, parts of Army Group B were taken away from the command of Weichs and incorporated into a new "Army Group Don", led by Manstein. Later in February, the remaining part merged with the Don Group into a newly reinstated Army Group South, also led by Manstein. Weichs was relieved of command.

Weichs was promoted to Field Marshal on 1 February 1943. In August 1943 Weichs was appointed Commander of Army Group F in the Balkans directing operations against local partisan groups. Since August 1943 Weichs was also OB Südost, commander-in-chief of the German occupied Greece and the Balkans (Yugoslavia, Albania and Thrace) whose headquarters were first in Belgrade and since 5 October 1944 in Vukovar. In April 1944 Weichs was appointed to the position of commander of all German troops stationed in Hungary. In late 1944, he oversaw the German retreat from Greece and most of Yugoslavia.

Weichs was retired on 25 March 1945 and was arrested by American troops in May. During the Nuremberg Trials, Weichs was said to be implicated in war crimes committed while suppressing the partisans. He was removed from the US Army's Hostages Trial for medical reasons without having been judged or sentenced.

Awards
Iron Cross of 1914 2nd Class (20 September 1914) & 1st Class (12 November 1915)
Clasp to the Iron Cross of 1939 2nd Class (18 September 1939) & 1st Class (29 September 1939)
Knight's Cross of the Iron Cross with Oak Leaves
 Knight's Cross on 29 June 1940 as General der Kavallerie and commander-in-chief of the 2. Armee
 Oak Leaves on 5 February 1945 as Generalfeldmarschall and commander-in-chief of Heeresgruppe F and OB Südost (commander-in-chief south east)

Promotions
Generaloberst: 19 July 1940; 
Generalfeldmarschall—1 February 1943

Notes

References
Citations

Bibliography

  Originally published as: 
 
 
 
  
 
 
 
 

1881 births
1954 deaths
Barons of Germany
German Army personnel of World War I
German Army World War II field marshals
Major generals of the Reichswehr
Military personnel from Saxony-Anhalt
People from Dessau-Roßlau
People indicted by the United States Nuremberg Military Tribunals
People indicted for crimes against humanity
People indicted for war crimes
Recipients of the clasp to the Iron Cross, 1st class
Recipients of the clasp to the Iron Cross, 2nd class
Recipients of the Knight's Cross of the Iron Cross with Oak Leaves